Nzingha: Warrior Queen of Matamba, Angola, Africa, 1595 is a 2000 book by Patricia McKissack about Queen Anna Nzinga as a girl told through fictitious diary entries based on real historical events. It is part of the book series The Royal Diaries.

Reception
Although found to have "an awkward, confusing narrative", Nzingha: Warrior Queen of Matamba, has also been described as "a good addition to the [Royal Diaries] series", and a "remarkable book".

It is a 2001 Notable Social Studies Trade Book for Young People

References

External links

Library holdings of Nzingha

2000 children's books
2000 American novels
American children's books
Children's historical novels
Books about Africa
Historiography of Angola
Books by Patricia McKissack
Fictional diaries
17th century in Angola